"Calma" is a single by Puerto Rican singer Pedro Capó. The song was co-written by Capó, George Noriega and Gabriel Edgar Gonzalez Perez.

A remix version featuring Farruko was released on October 5, 2018. The remix video has received over 2.0 billion views on YouTube. Since its release, the song has become a huge success, topping the charts of Argentina, Bolivia, Chile, Colombia, Costa Rica, the Dominican Republic, El Salvador, Guatemala, Italy, Mexico, Panama, Paraguay, Peru, Uruguay and Venezuela. The song also received a Latin double-platinum certification by the Recording Industry Association of America (RIAA) for units of over 120,000 sales plus track-equivalent streams.

Following its success, a remix version featuring Alicia Keys was released on April 19, 2019. Finally, a Future bounce remix by Alan Walker of the Farruko remix was released on June 21, 2019, by Sony Music Entertainment.

On July 18, 2019, Capó and Farruko performed an exclusive version of the song with Lali at the 2019 Premios Juventud. Suzette Fernandez of Billboard highlighted the performance as one of the six best of the night, saying that it "was the perfect fit for the show, because it brought the summer vibes that the awards are known for."

Charts

Original version

Remix version

Year-end charts

Decade-end charts

Notes

Certifications

See also
List of Airplay 100 number ones of the 2010s
 List of Billboard Argentina Hot 100 number-one singles of 2019
 List of airplay number-one hits of the 2010s (Argentina)
List of Billboard number-one Latin songs of 2019

References

2018 singles
2018 songs
Sony Music Latin singles
Pedro Capó songs
Alicia Keys songs
Vocal duets
Number-one singles in Italy
Number-one singles in Romania
Spanish-language songs
Songs written by George Noriega
Argentina Hot 100 number-one singles
Songs written by Pedro Capó
Latin Grammy Award for Song of the Year
Latin Grammy Award for Best Urban Fusion/Performance
Songs containing the I–V-vi-IV progression
Farruko songs
Songs written by Alicia Keys